Kevin Carlos Omoruyi Benjamin (born 10 April 2001), known as Kevin Carlos, is a Spanish footballer who plays as a forward for Betis Deportivo Balompié, on loan from SD Huesca.

Club career
Born in Ceuta to a Spanish mother and a Nigerian father, Kevin Carlos was a SD Huesca youth graduate. He made his senior debut with farm team AD Almudévar on 2 September 2018, starting and scoring the opener in a 2–2 Tercera División away draw against Atlético Monzón.

In 2019, Kevin Carlos returned to the youth categories after the partnership with Almudévar ended, and spent the season playing for the Juvenil A team. For the 2020–21 campaign, he was assigned to the reserves, now also in the fourth level, and renewed his contract until 2023 on 28 July 2020.

Kevin Carlos made his first team debut on 15 December 2020, coming on as an extra-time substitute for goalscorer Rafa Mir in a 3–2 away win over CD Marchamalo, for the season's Copa del Rey. He scored his first goal for the main squad on 30 November of the following year, netting the second of a 2–0 success at CD Cayón, also for the national cup.

Kevin Carlos' professional debut occurred on 14 December 2021, as he started in a 0–1 home loss against Girona FC, also for the Copa del Rey. He scored his first professional goal the following 4 September, netting the opener in a 3–0 Segunda División home win over UD Ibiza.

On 12 January 2023, Kevin Carlos joined Betis Deportivo on loan until the end of the season with an option to purchase.

References

External links

2001 births
Living people
Footballers from Ceuta
Spanish footballers
Association football forwards
Segunda División players
Segunda Federación players
Tercera División players
AD Almudévar players
SD Huesca B players
SD Huesca footballers
Betis Deportivo Balompié footballers
Spanish people of Nigerian descent
Spanish sportspeople of African descent